The Zionist Freedom Alliance (ZFA) is a Zionist movement that advocates Israel's moral, legal and  historic rights for the Jewish people to the entire Land of Israel, which they consider to include the territory captured during the 1967 Six-Day War. It was  established in 1999 by Magshimey Herut activists in response to what they perceived to be growing anti-Israel sentiment among young people throughout the world. ZFA claims that their narrative has not been presented since before the start of the Oslo peace process and that this has resulted in the world's ignorance of Israel's claim to all territory between the Mediterranean Sea and Jordan River. ZFA views Zionism as a revolutionary struggle and itself as the voice of Jewish national liberation. Its members are both religious and non-religious Jews.

Ideology

Revolutionary Zionism 
Heavily influenced by the philosophy of Israel Eldad, ZFA views Zionism as the national liberation movement of the Jewish people and a revolution unparalleled by any other in human history. The movement validates this claim by emphasizing that while various revolutions have succeeded in leaving their mark on human development, none have succeeded in reviving a dead language or relocating a scattered nation from dispersion to a central location. ZFA defines the Zionist Revolution as the liberation of Jewish land from foreign rule, the ingathering of the Jewish people from the exile to their soil, the revival of Hebrew as a spoken language for everyday use, and the creation of a utopian society that will serve as a model of social justice to the world. The movement views itself as the vanguard of this revolution and often calls itself the “voice of Jewish liberation.” The above views are featured on the organization's website and have been expressed repeatedly by ZFA leader Yehuda HaKohen, who hosts two internet based programs on Arutz Sheva radio.

Jewish National Rights 
While mainstream Jewish leaders and pro-Israel organizations on American campuses often try to present the State of Israel as a democratic Western country with numerous security challenges, the Zionist Freedom Alliance speaks of Israel as a Middle Eastern nation with a legitimate moral and historic right to its entire country.

ZFA views the Jewish people as indigenous to the Middle East and the victims of Western imperialism. Leading activists of the movement have often pointed out that Great Britain, the United Nations and even the United States government did everything in their power to prevent a Jewish state from coming into existence. The Zionist struggle, according to ZFA, is therefore an anti-imperialist struggle aimed at liberating the land of Israel from foreign rule and securing the Jewish people's right to self determination in their country.

National Liberation 
As a national liberation movement, ZFA alleges to advocate freedom for all nations from foreign rule (specifically the Chechens, Kurds, and Irish) but denies that freedom to a Palestinian nation whom ZFA claims does not exist. The movement officially argues in its "Covenant of Freedom" that while there has yet to be a serious and objective historical analysis of the claims that "Palestinian" Arabs constitute a distinct national group, there is overwhelming evidence that the notion of such a people was invented as a propaganda weapon to be used in the war against Zionism. ZFA activists have also been known to more assertively argue that a Palestinian national identity was invented in the 1960s by the Arab League and Western powers for the purpose of robbing the Jewish people of their homeland. ZFA claims that multi-national corporations and Western governments seeking to promote globalization have been using the Palestinian Arabs as a political tool against the State of Israel and that the front line in the battle against globalization is actually the struggle to retain Greater Israel. Unlike movements on Israel's political right, ZFA avoids anti-Arab rhetoric and actually advocates Israel becoming more Middle Eastern in character. Many ZFA leaders, including Elie Yossef and Yehuda HaKohen, have put forward the need for a genuine peace agreement between Israel and the Arabs but have rejected the notion of territorial concessions as this would be – in the view of ZFA – an historic injustice against the Jewish people.
 
Although opposed to many policies of recent Israeli governments, ZFA views the State of Israel as being of great historic significance and deserving of their loyalty. The movement places unity amongst Jews of all persuasions on equal footing with the territorial integrity of the land of Israel and therefore works to create dialogue and strengthen the bond between Jews with opposing political and religious opinions.

Views on Peace and the Middle East Conflict 
Although ZFA members are not known to have uniform views regarding possible solutions to the Arab–Israeli conflict, the organization officially opposes the notion of territorial concessions by Israel. At the same time, Yehuda HaKohen has used his radio show on several occasions to speak out against Islamophobia and has articulated a position that places blame for the conflict not on Arab or Jewish shoulders but on third parties, particularly the United States and Europe, who attempt to broker solutions between the sides.

Activities 

ZFA differs from other Zionist movements is that it fights for social causes often associated with the left while maintaining a hard right position on Jewish national identity and Israel's borders. In November 2007, the Jewish Telegraphic Agency reported the ZFA to be promoting Israeli nationalism on twenty American college campuses and described the group as socially liberal with a hard-right stance on Israeli border issues.

On American campuses 
ZFA trains activists on college campus to promote what the group terms "Jewish liberation." In February 2008 the ZFA created controversy at the University of Pennsylvania by holding a demonstration against Breaking the Silence, a group of ex-Israeli soldiers who came to the campus in order to speak against the IDF's presence in territories captured by Israel in the 1967 Six-Day War. ZFA accused Breaking the Silence of being financed by Western governments to smear the State of Israel, an accusation that was later validated by The Jerusalem Post in July 2009.

Violence at Berkeley 
On November 13, 2008, violence erupted between ZFA and the Students for Justice in Palestine at an Israel Liberation Week event taking place at UC Berkeley. The incident, which took place during a ZFA concert featuring Black, Jewish and Mexican hip hop artists promoting freedom for Israel from Western pressure and foreign influence, began when anti-Israel students unfurled Palestinian flags from a balcony overlooking the concert stage. ZFA activists attempted to remove the flags and a fight broke out between the two organizations. While both groups accused the other of initiating the violence, both agreed that ZFA prevailed in the actual fight. Following the incident, SJP members told Berkeley police that pro-Israel students made racial slurs against Arab students during the fight but the charge was denied by ZFA leaders, who view both themselves and Arabs as belonging to the same Semitic race.

Following the incident, one Jew and two Arabs were cited with charges of battery by Berkeley police. Mainstream Jewish organizations refrained from taking any sides in the conflict but distanced themselves from ZFA by denouncing all acts of violence and violations of university policy.

Strengthening the Jewish presence of Beit Hanina 
In 2009 a number of ZFA members moved into the Beit Shiva building in the East Jerusalem neighborhood of Beit Hanina. The building had been inhabited by veteran Lehi fighters following the 1967 Six-Day War and had remained the sole Jewish building in an otherwise Arab neighborhood. Concerned that as the elderly Lehi veterans die the Jewish hold on the building would be weakened, ZFA activists began to move into apartments left vacant by deceased tenants.

Shomron Volunteer Program 
In August 2009 ZFA and the Shomron Liaisons Office cooperated to create a volunteer program for American students in the hilltop communities of the Samaria region. The controversial Jewish communities had been the central focus of American pressure on Israel's government and students looking to defy Washington and strengthen Israel's hold on the region spent a week working, building and farming in Yitzhar, Shalhevet Yam, Har Brakha, Kfar Tapuach, and Havat Gilad. The Jerusalem Post reported ZFA leader Yehuda HaKohen working with a dozen program participants planting a vineyard on a hilltop near the Har Brakha community, just outside Shechem. In October 2009 the week long volunteer program was repeated at the village of El Matan.

See also
 Greater Israel
 International law and the Arab–Israeli conflict
 Israel Eldad
 Israeli settlement
 International law and Israeli settlements
 Labor Zionism
 Land of Israel
 Left-wing nationalism
 Lehi (group)
 Movement for Greater Israel
 Magshimey Herut
 Religious Zionism
 Revisionist Zionism
 Status of territories captured by Israel
 Zionism
 Zionist youth movement

References

External links
 ZFA website
L'Herut Tzion (ZFA in Israel) website
 Covenant of Freedom (ZFA Manifesto)

Zionism
Zionist youth movements
Political organizations based in Israel
Jewish youth organizations
Political movements
1999 establishments in Israel